W33 may refer to :
 W33 (nuclear weapon), a 1957 American nuclear artillery shell
 Hansa-Brandenburg W.33, a 1920s German two-seat, low winged single-engined seaplane
 Junkers W 33, a 1926 German-built, single-engine, passenger- and transport aircraft
 Friday Harbor Seaplane Base, a seaplane base located on Friday Harbor, Washington